Dinocephalia  may refer to:
 Dinocephalia, a synapsid suborder from the Permian
 Dinocephalia (beetle), a beetle genus